Abu'l-Qasim Ahmad al-Mustansir, (c. 1210 – 28 November 1261) was the first Abbasid caliph to rule in Cairo and who was subservient to the Mamluk Sultanate. He reigned from June 1261 to 28 November 1261.

Life 
Abu'l-Qasim Ahmad was a member of the Abbasid house who was imprisoned by his nephew the Caliph al-Musta'sim in Baghdad. Following the Sack of Baghdad by the Mongols in 1258, he escaped to the Arab tribes in the desert, where he hid out for over three years, until after the Mamluks had driven the Mongols from Syria in 1260. After making his way to Cairo, Mamluk Egypt, al-Mustansir was installed as Caliph there by the Mamluk Sultan Baybars I in 1261. He was sent with an army to the east to recover Baghdad, but was killed in a Mongol ambush near al-Anbar (near Falluja in modern Iraq) in 1261, and was succeeded, though not immediately, by his rather distant Abbasid kinsman (and former rival caliph, having been proclaimed by the ruler of Aleppo) Al-Hakim I. Though he was not the direct ancestor of any of them, the line of Cairo caliphs Ahmad al-Mustansir founded lasted until the Ottoman conquest of Egypt in 1517, but they were little more than religious figureheads for the Mamluks.

References

Bibliography
Amitai-Preisss, Reuven. Mongols and Mamluks: The Mamluk-Ilkhanid War, 1260-1281. Cambridge: Cambridge University Press, 1995. Pp. 56–60, 62.

Glubb, John Bagot. Soldiers of Fortune: The Story of the Mamlukes. New York: Dorset Press, 1988. Pp. 66, 73–75. 
Holt, P. M. "al-Mustansir (II)." The Encyclopaedia of Islam. 2nd ed. Vol. VII. P. 729.

|-

1262 deaths
Cairo-era Abbasid caliphs
13th-century Abbasid caliphs
Year of birth unknown
Monarchs killed in action
13th-century Egyptian people
Sons of Abbasid caliphs